The Bucknell Bison men's lacrosse team represents Bucknell University in the Patriot League of the National Collegiate Athletic Association (NCAA) Division I men's lacrosse. Bucknell has played lacrosse at the varsity level since 1968.

History

The Bucknell lacrosse team was founded in 1968, as a member of the Middle Atlantic Conference (MAC). They went 6-3 that year and undefeated in conference.  They won the MAC title the next year. In 1975, they joined the East Coast Conference, which they won twice, in 1978 and 1985. In 1991, they joined the Patriot League. They have won the Patriot League regular season title nine times, in 1996, 2000, 2001, 2002, 2003, 2005, 2009, 2011, and 2018. In 2001, they played in their first NCAA tournament game, which Notre Dame won 12-7. In 2005, the only coach they had ever had, Sid Jamieson, retired. He was replaced with Frank Fedorjaka, who has been their coach ever since. They won their only Patriot League championship in 2011, defeating Colgate University 10-3.  They reached their second ever NCAA lacrosse tournament game that year, which they lost to the University of Virginia 13-12 in overtime. They currently compete as a member of the Patriot League and play their home games in Lewisburg, Pennsylvania at Christy Mathewson-Memorial Stadium.

Season results
The following is a list of Bucknell’s results by season since the institution of NCAA Division I in 1971:

{| class="wikitable"

|- align="center"

†NCAA canceled 2020 collegiate activities due to the COVID-19 virus.

Bucknell Lacrosse Hall Of Fame
James W. McKee, M

C. Edwin Farver, M

Louis L. Kissling, Jr., A

Ralph Turri, M

Thomas H. Sanders, G

Peter W. von Hoffman, A

Rodney Brown, M/D

Thomas E. Cusick, A

Justin W. Zackey, A

Hugh Donovan, D

Chris Cara, A

Sid Jamieson, Coach

See also
 Bucknell Bison
 Lacrosse in Pennsylvania
 Sid Jamieson

References

External links